The Art Prize of the German Democratic Republic (German: Kunstpreis der Deutschen Demokratischen Republik) was an East German state award bestowed on individuals for contributions in various fields of art.

History
The Art Prize was annually awarded in recognition of "outstanding creative and interpretive achievements" in visual arts, applied arts, cinema, television, radio and entertainment. It could be conferred to individual recipients or in collective, to groups of no more than six people. The recipients were awarded a silver-coated metal medal, 20 millimeter in diameter, with the inscription Kunstpreis. Beside it, a single grantee would also be entitled to a sum of 6,000 East German Marks, while a collective would get a sum as high as 20,000. The Art Prize was the country's highest honor for artists, and was outranked only by the National Prize of East Germany.

It was first awarded by Minister of Culture Alexander Abusch to nineteen recipients, on 22 January 1959. The Ministry's decree declared that it was bestowed "in recognition of outstanding and unique artistic achievements and for promotion of artistic creativity." The Art Prize was conferred twice more during the year, in April and October. It was again awarded thrice during 1960, in March, October and December. From 1961, it was conferred only once every year, on varying months. The last presentation ceremony took place on the night of 3 October 1990, just before the state was dissolved.

Notable recipients

Sylvia Geszty (1966)
Peter Damm (1972)
Konrad Wolf (1971)
Wolf Kaiser (1961)
Fred Delmare (1960)
Inge Keller (1960)
Angelica Domröse (1969)
Peter Sturm (1961)
Hannelore Bey (1970)
Hartmut Haenchen (1984)
Rolf Herricht (1973, 1977)
Hans-Joachim Preil (1977)
Karat  (in collective, 1979)
Günter Kochan (1959)
Peter Konwitschny (1988)
Dieter Mann (1975)
Ulrich Thein (1969, 1984)
Hans-Joachim Rotzsch (1967)
Günter Sommer (1985)
Adele Stolte (1966)
Armin Mueller-Stahl (1963)
Karl Gass (1970)
Hannjo Hasse (1971)
Siegfried Thiele (1983)
Werner Dissel (1986)

See also

 List of European art awards

References

External links
A photograph of the Art Prize's medal.
East German Art Prize data.

Awards established in 1959
Awards disestablished in 1990
Orders, decorations, and medals of East Germany
Visual arts awards
Acting awards
1959 establishments in East Germany
1990 disestablishments in East Germany